Auxanography is the study of the effects of changes in environment on the growth of microorganisms, by means of auxanograms. It was first devised by Beijerinck for testing the effect of various nutrient media upon bacteria.

The bacteria are plated out in a medium known to be poorly adapted for their nourishment, and then drops of the tested solutions are added to the surface of the plate. If the requisite nutrient has been added, the bacteria will develop rapidly in these spots.

See also

 
 Eutrophication

References

 G. Pontecorvo (1949) Auxanography techniques in biochemical genetics, Microbiology 3(1)

Microbiology techniques